"Like That" is a song by American rapper Doja Cat featuring fellow American rapper Gucci Mane. It was written by both artists along with Theron Thomas, Lydia Asrat, David Sprecher, & producers  Dr. Luke (credited as Tyson Trax) and Mike Crook. Originally included as a track on Doja's 2019 album Hot Pink, it became a single on May 12, 2020, following a viral dance challenge using the song on the app TikTok.

Before "Like That" had become a single in May, the song had already begun to chart in several countries following the viral TikTok dance which used the song. Following its release as a single, the song peaked at number 50 on the US Billboard Hot 100. The music video was released on June 25, 2020. Doja Cat promoted the single with multiple live performances, including at the 2020 Video Music Awards, the Billboard Music Awards, and Dick Clark's New Year's Rockin' Eve.

Background 
On November 1, 2019, Doja Cat announced that her album Hot Pink would be released on November 8, 2019, and revealed the track listing alongside the album's release. The song "Like That" was confirmed to have a featured artist that would not be announced until the album's release, when it was revealed to be Gucci Mane. Similar to its predecessor "Say So", the song entered the charts before its single release due to a viral dance challenge using the song on the app TikTok. Consequently, "Like That" charted ahead of release as a single in the United Kingdom, Canada and Ireland.

Music video 

An accompanying music video for the song was filmed in Los Angeles before the state went on lockdown due to the COVID-19 pandemic. In May 2020, the video was leaked online via Twitter, generating controversy. On June 22, 2020, Doja confirmed that she was fully aware of the video leak and stated that the leaked video was not the official video and that the official video would be released soon. The official music video was released on June 25, 2020, and has over 200 million views on YouTube.

Synopsis
The video starts with the title card panning down to Doja Cat standing in a futuristic blue set among her backup dancers. Doja and the dancers start dancing, intercut with shots of an animated version of Cat, which sparked comparisons to the anime television series Sailor Moon. The video is plastered with animated graphics throughout the video. Doja Cat eventually meets up with collaborator Gucci Mane, who leans and poses in front of a convertible while rapping his verse of the song. Doja who is either dancing beside Mane or in the convertible takes back the song and ends the video with the splits on beat, followed by a black screen.

Live performances 
"Like That" was first performed in a medley with previous single, "Say So", at the 2020 MTV Video Music Awards. She also performed a medley of "Juicy", "Say So" and "Like That" at the 2020 Billboard Music Awards. She performed the song at Dick Clark's New Year's Rockin' Eve.

Critical reception 
Lakin Starling of Pitchfork wrote, "Doja weaves easily from rap mode into a whispery chorus with an upbeat R&B groove reminiscent of early-2000s Janet Jackson. It's the perfect soundtrack for a backyard party." Comparing the song's composition to that of songs that previously popularized on TikTok, Cat Zhang from the same publication wrote, "Doja's softer, girlier aesthetic offered an alternative to the vulgar, brutish rap that previously soundtracked the platform. And her brash, confident lyrics [...] offer snippets of female empowerment."

Chart performance
Before "Like That" had become a single in May, the song had already begun to chart in several countries following the viral TikTok dance which used the song. Following its release as a single, the song peaked at number 50 on the US Billboard Hot 100, and charted in other territories such as Argentina and Australia. The song additionally appeared in three year-end charts for the year of 2020 in the US: Hot R&B/Hip-Hop Songs, and the radio airplay charts Mainstream Top 40 and Rhythmic.

Credits and personnel
Recording
 Gucci Mane's vocals engineered at Hit Factory Criteria (Miami, Florida)
 Mixed at Threejonet Studios (Los Angeles, California)
 Mastered at Bernie Grundman Mastering (Hollywood, California)

Personnel

Doja Cat – vocals, songwriting
Lukasz Gottwald – songwriting; production 
Theron Thomas – songwriting
Lydia Asrat – songwriting
David Sprecher – songwriting
Gucci Mane – vocals, songwriting
Emix – Gucci Mane's vocals engineering
Chloe Angelides – additional vocals
Clint Gibbs – mixing
Mike Bozzi – mastering

Credits adapted from Hot Pink liner notes.

Charts

Weekly charts

Year-end charts

Certifications

Release history

Footnotes

References

2019 songs
2020 singles
Doja Cat songs
Gucci Mane songs
Songs written by Theron Thomas
Song recordings produced by Dr. Luke
Songs written by Dr. Luke
Songs written by Gucci Mane
Songs written by Doja Cat
Songs written by Yeti Beats
RCA Records singles
Kemosabe Records singles